TRNA (guanine10-N2)-dimethyltransferase (PAB1283, N(2),N(2)-dimethylguanosine tRNA methyltransferase, Trm-G10, PabTrm-G10, PabTrm-m2 2G10 enzyme) is an enzyme with systematic name S-adenosyl-L-methionine:tRNA (guanine10-N2)-dimethyltransferase. This enzyme catalyses the following chemical reaction

 2 S-adenosyl-L-methionine + guanine10 in tRNA  2 S-adenosyl-L-homocysteine + N2-dimethylguanine10 in tRNA (overall reaction)
(1a) S-adenosyl-L-methionine + guanine10 in tRNA  S-adenosyl-L-homocysteine + N2-methylguanine10 in tRNA
(1b) S-adenosyl-L-methionine + N2-methylguanine10 in tRNA  S-adenosyl-L-homocysteine + N2-dimethylguanine10 in tRNA

References

External links 
 

EC 2.1.1